Elliott Poss (c. 1948 – February 14, 2006) was an American football coach. He served as the head football coach at Presbyterian College in Clinton, South Carolina from 1985 to 1990, compiling a record of 29–38–1. Poss was an assistant as Presbyterian  from 1975 to 1984. During his stints as head coach, he mentored future Presbyterian head coach Harold Nichols.

Head coaching record

References

Year of birth missing
1940s births
2006 deaths
Presbyterian Blue Hose football coaches
Presbyterian College alumni
University of Georgia alumni
People from Wilkes County, Georgia